The Dubai 24 Hour Race is both a sports car and touring car automobile endurance race held annually at the Dubai Autodrome. It was inaugurated in 2006.

Entrants and participants

As with all races in the 24H Series, promoted by Dutch promoter Creventic, they are open to both professional and semi-professional teams. There are both local competitors from the UAE and surrounding nations in the Persian Gulf as well as a host of international teams particularly from European nations.

Unlike the 24 Hours of Le Mans in France whereby teams are invited by the organizers to compete, the Dubai 24 Hour is solely made up of teams who have registered prior to the commencing of the actual race. Entrants must file in a registration application in order to have a chance at competing. Entry and registration fees also apply for competitors.

Class structure
The race features both a variety of Grand tourer (GT), touring cars as well as specially built silhouette cars from a wide range of marques which are eligible to enter. These range from small-engined Super 2000 hatchbacks (such as the Renault Clio and Honda Civic) to racing-bred sport cars (such as the Porsche 911 GT3 & Marcos Mantis GT).

A method of performance-balancing by the organisers of the event is existent throughout many of the classes featured in the Endurance Race. An example of this can be witnessed in the A2 Class whereby Super 1600 cars race alongside Super 2000 and run on equal performance as the 1,600 cc cars are allowed to carry less weight. Other factors such as a larger fuel tank and also the tire manufacturer for specific classes or ensure even competition.

Classes

A1
This is class restricted for subcompact cars. Cars with a maximum engine displacement of 1,300 cc can run on a minimum weight of 750 kg and an 80-litre fuel tank while cars with displacements up to 1,600 cc are run with a minimum weight of 820 kg and a 90-litre fuel tank. Cars that can feature in this class include the Honda Jazz, Toyota Echo, Nissan Tiida as well as other makes.

A2
The A2 class features a host of Super 1600 and Super 2000 vehicles. These cars generally feature hatchback and small sedan vehicles. The engine displacement range in this class is between 1,600 cc and 2,000 cc and turbocharging for performance enhancement is not allowed. 1,600 cc to 1,800 cc vehicles can have a minimum weight of 900 kg while 1,800 cc to 2,000 cc cars are to have a minimum weight of 980 kg. Compact cars generally make up the field for the A2 Class with the most common makes being the Clio Renault Sport and the Honda Civic Type R.

A3T
This class is specifically for cars with engine displacement up to 2,500 cc their engine is enhanced by a turbocharger. In other words, only vehicles which are turbocharged are eligible to compete in the class. All cars in this class run on 100-litre fuel tanks regardless of engine displacement or car weight. In the 2009 version of the race, the class was mainly made up of Turbo-diesel or TDI compact cars such as the SEAT León Super Copa and the Volkswagen Golf R-Line.

A4
The A4 Class is made-up entirely of mid-size cars with an engine displacement between 2,000 cc and 3,000 cc. Due to the wide nature of eligibility of this class, there are certain restrictions on larger engine vehicles. Cars between 2,000 cc and 2,500 cc can have a minimum weight of 1,000 kg while cars between 2,500 cc and 3,000 cc are to have a minimum weight of 1,100 kg. In the 2009, Dubai 24 Hour, the class featured three BMW 130i, a BMW Z4 Coupe and a Porsche 964 Carrera.

A5
The A5 class pits genuine FIA-GT4 category cars against each however, the cars in this class are to have a maximum displacement of 3,500 cc. Most of the vehicles in this class are sports car coupes with V8, 3.0L+ engines. All cars are required to weigh at least 1,200 kg and utilise a 120-litre fuel tank which are standard across the category. The 2009 24 Hour Race saw an entire field of a number of makes from the German manufacturer BMW ranging from Z4 Coupes to modified M3 GT-Rs.

A6
This is the highest echelon of Petrol-driven vehicles in the race and is also the quickest category in the race. It features a host of FIA-approved GT3 Category cars from across the globe. The vehicles must have at least 3,500 cc of engine displacement and cannot exceed 4,000 cc. Due to the vehicles with 3,750 cc to 4,000 cc having an acceleration and top-speed edge than the makes below 3,750 cc, they must carry at least 1,300 kg of weight, thus being the heaviest of the entire race and can only have tanks capable of carrying 90 litres of fuel. Vehicles below this, can have a minimum weight limit of 1,150 kg and a 120-litre fuel tank.

991 & 997 Class 
Class 997 Porsche 997 Cup Cars* (models 2007..2013)
Class 991 Porsche 991 Cup Cars* (models 2014..2017)

D1
The first of the diesel powered-car classes, this class aims at drawing together an array of vehicles driven on diesel for the full duration of the race. D1 features vehicles with Engine displacements up to 2,000 cc, which is ideal for smaller-sized hatchback TDI vehicles. This is why the 2009 grid saw an array of European hatchbacks including the Volkswagen Scirocco R, SEAT León TDI and BMW 120d.

D2
The D2 class caters for diesel-powered vehicles exceeding the limit of 2,000 cc in D1. Generally, mid-sized & full-sized cars occupy the grid. Turbocharging is permitted in this class but handicaps apply to higher displacement vehicles. For example, cars with 2,500 cc to 3,000 cc must meet the minimum limit of 1,200 kg while cars below that displacement have a minimum weight limit of 1,100 kg. A number of BMW 120d makes featured in the class in the 2009 race as well as a BMW 320d.

SP1
The SP1 class is the first of the Special Cars class and houses silhouette petrol-driven racing cars which have a chassis modified from their production counterparts. SP1 sees a mix of uniquely designed vehicles built specifically for high-powered Touring car racing. The vehicles in this category often vary in great lengths in engine size, power and vehicle weight, therefore, vehicles who fit the Solution F category can have a minimum weight of just 950 kg and a 120-litre fuel tank. Other silhouette cars with engines up 3,200 cc of displacement can have a minimum weight of 975 kg and are restricted to a 100-litre fuel tank. Cars with 3,200 cc to 3,600 cc must have a weight of at least 1,050 kg and a fuel tank with a capacity of 100L.

SP2 GT3-A
This is a class reserved for FIA GT3 entrants whose vehicles surpass the 4,000 cc Engine displacement limit for the A6 cars and also for GT3 cars which have 6+ cylinders.

SP3 GT4-A
This is a class similar to the SP2 GT3-A category and it is reserved for FIA GT4-spec vehicles. There are performance balancing measures enforced by the racing organizers to balance out the field in the class. Depending on the Engine displacement of the vehicle an entrant will be assigned a minimum weight limit of either 750 kg or 1,200 kg and also a fuel tank capacity limit of either 120 litres or 100 litres.

SP4
This is the newest class for the race and is solely for hybrid vehicle racing cars and electric-powered race cars.  It will be running for the first time in 2010 edition of the Dubai 24 Hour. There are currently no performance balancing measures for the class.

Race winners

Manufacturer title wins

See also
 24H Series

Notes

References

External links
 

 
24H Series
Auto races in the United Arab Emirates
Sports car races
Touring car races
Endurance motor racing
Recurring sporting events established in 2006
2006 establishments in the United Arab Emirates